The following lists events that happened in 2007 in Iceland.

Incumbents
President – Ólafur Ragnar Grímsson 
Prime Minister – Geir Haarde

Events

May
 May 12 - Parliamentary elections were held.

 
2000s in Iceland
Iceland
Iceland
Years of the 21st century in Iceland